Elizabeth Ann Perkins (born November 18, 1960) is an American actress. Her film roles have included About Last Night (1986), Big (1988), Avalon (1990), and He Said, She Said (1991), The Flintstones (1994), Miracle on 34th Street (1994), and her brief voice role as Coral in the Disney/Pixar animated film Finding Nemo (2003). She is also well known for her role as Celia Hodes in the Showtime TV series Weeds, for which she received three Primetime Emmy nominations and two Golden Globe nominations.

Early life 
Perkins was born in Queens, New York, to Jo Williams, a drug treatment counselor, and James Perkins, a farmer, writer, and businessman. She has two sisters . Her paternal grandparents were Greek immigrants from Salonika who anglicized their surname from "Pisperikos" to "Perkins" when they moved to the United States. 

Perkins was raised in Colrain, Massachusetts; her parents divorced in 1963. She began working in theatre with Arena Civic Theatre, a non-profit community theatre group based in Greenfield, Massachusetts. Perkins attended Northfield Mount Hermon School, an elite preparatory school, and then spent 1978 to 1981 in Chicago attaining her Certificate in Acting from the Goodman School of Drama at DePaul University. In 1984, she made her theatrical debut on Broadway in Neil Simon's Brighton Beach Memoirs  and afterward, worked in a number of ensemble companies, including The New York Shakespeare Festival and the Steppenwolf Theater.

Career 
She was listed as one of the 12 "Promising New Actors of 1986" in John Willis' Screen World, and has since landed numerous film roles. Perkins made her film debut in 1986 in Edward Zwick's About Last Night... and had a career breakthrough co-starring with Tom Hanks in Big. She received critical acclaim for her performance in Barry Levinson's Avalon, and was a standout opposite William Hurt in The Doctor (1991), receiving critical acclaim for her performance as a terminal cancer patient. In 1993, Perkins appeared in the television project For Their Own Good. She later starred in the comedy series Battery Park and has appeared in television and films including Miracle on 34th Street and 2000's 28 Days starring as Sandra Bullock's sister. Perkins also had a small role in the 2003 film Finding Nemo, voicing Coral who was the wife of Marlin and mother of Nemo, and who was killed and eaten by the barracuda in the beginning of the film. Perkins also appeared as a psychiatrist in the 2005 suspense thriller, The Ring Two, starring Naomi Watts.

She played Wilma Flintstone in the 1994 live-action comedy The Flintstones.

From 2005 to 2009, Perkins played Celia Hodes, an alcoholic and image-obsessed parent–teacher association (PTA) mother, alongside Mary-Louise Parker and Justin Kirk on the Showtime series Weeds. For her work on Weeds, Perkins received two Golden Globe nominations for Best Supporting Actress in a TV Series, Miniseries or Made for TV Motion Picture (in 2006 and 2007). She was also nominated three times for an Emmy Award for Best Supporting Actress in a Comedy Series for her work on Weeds. At a screening of the season 2 finale of Weeds, at the Museum of TV and Radio on October 25, 2006, Perkins said that she considers Celia Hodes her favorite role in her career. On May 6, 2010, she announced that the fifth season of Weeds was her last despite the cliffhanger her character had in the season finale.

She starred in the ABC comedy series How to Live with Your Parents (For the Rest of Your Life). She played Birdie in the Netflix original series GLOW.

Personal life 
Perkins married Terry Kinney in 1984; they divorced in 1988. She has one daughter, Hannah Jo Phillips (born September 1, 1991), with Maurice Phillips. In 2000, she married Argentinian-born cinematographer Julio Macat, gaining three stepsons: Maximillian, Alexander and Andreas.

In 2005, at the age of 44, she learned that she had latent autoimmune diabetes, a form of type 1 diabetes that is most often diagnosed in middle age.

In 2017, Perkins held a sign naming the actor James Woods above the hashtag #MeToo during a rally against sexual harassment in Los Angeles.

Filmography

Film

Television

Awards and nominations

References

External links 

 
 
 
 
 
 

20th-century American actresses
21st-century American actresses
Actresses from Massachusetts
Actresses from New York City
American film actresses
American people of Greek descent
American television actresses
American voice actresses
Living people
Northfield Mount Hermon School alumni
People from Colrain, Massachusetts
People from Queens, New York
People with type 1 diabetes
1960 births